Hamadi Camara (born 12 January 1942) is a Malian judoka. He competed in the men's half-heavyweight event at the 1972 Summer Olympics.

References

External links
 

1942 births
Living people
Malian male judoka
Olympic judoka of Mali
Judoka at the 1972 Summer Olympics
Place of birth missing (living people)
21st-century Malian people